Costelytra zealandica (commonly known as the grass grub) is a species of scarab beetle found in forested areas of greater Wellington. It was originally described in 1846 by the British entomologist Adam White as Rhisotrogus zealandicus from a specimen obtained during the Ross expedition. The species is known to feed on roots of plants and trees, so is considered a pest for many farm pastures.

Prior to 2016, the New Zealand grass grub was mischaracterized as C. zealandica. In 2016 Coca-Abia and Romero-Samper found differences in syntype specimens between White's (1846) C. zealandica and Given's (1952) description and revised the species name of the latter to Costelytra giveni after Given.

References

Melolonthinae
Beetles of New Zealand